
Year 776 (DCCLXXVI) was a leap year starting on Monday (link will display the full calendar) of the Julian calendar. The denomination 776 for this year has been used since the early medieval period, when the Anno Domini calendar era became the prevalent method in Europe for naming years.

Events 
<onlyinclude>

By place

Byzantine Empire 
 April 24 – Emperor Leo IV ("the Khazar") appoints his 5-year-old son Constantine VI co-ruler of the Byzantine Empire. This leads to an uprising, led by one of Leo's half-brothers, Caesar Nikephoros, the second son of former emperor Constantine V. The revolt is quickly suppressed. Fortunately for Nikephoros, his only punishment is to be stripped of his titles, while the rest of the conspirators are blinded, tonsured, and exiled to Cherson (southern Crimea) under guard.

Europe 
 King Charlemagne spends Easter in Treviso (northern Italy), after putting down a rebellion in Friuli and Spoleto. He removes Hrodgaud of Friuli from power, and reforms the duchy as the March of Friuli (military frontier district). Co-conspirators who support the revolt are Arechis II, duke of Benevento, and Adalgis, son of former Lombard king Desiderius. Frankish counts are placed in the cities of Friuli.
 Saxon Wars: The Saxons again revolt against Christianity and Frankish rule. Eresburg falls, but a Saxon assault upon the castle of Syburg fails. Charlemagne hurriedly returns from Italy, launching a counter-offensive which defeats the Saxons. Most of their leaders are summoned to the Lippe at the town of Bad Lippspringe (North Rhine-Westphalia), to submit formally to Charlemagne.

Britain 
 Battle of Otford: King Egbert II of Kent defeats the Mercians under King Offa (near Otford), and re-asserts himself as ruler of Kent.

Births 
February – Al-Jahiz, Afro-Muslim scholar and writer (d. 868)
date unknown – Lu Sui, chancellor of the Tang  Dynasty (d. 835)
probable 
 Saint George the Standard-Bearer, archbishop (d. 821)
 Bai Xingjian, Chinese poet and writer (d. 826)
 Sahnun ibn Sa'id, Muslim jurist (or 777)
 Tahir ibn Husayn, Muslim governor (or 775)

Deaths 
date unknown
 Cellach mac Dúnchada, king of Leinster (Ireland)
 Cináed Ciarrge mac Cathussaig, Dál nAraide king
 Flaithniadh mac Congal, abbot of Clonfert
 Hrodgaud, duke of Friuli (Italy)
 Humayd ibn Qahtaba, Muslim military leader
 Nuada ua Bolcain, abbot of Tuam (Ireland)

References